Aaron Jack, (October 20, 1975) full name Daniel Aaron Jack, is an American businessman and former politician.

Education
Jack received his bachelor's degree from the University of Kansas, his master's degree in business administration from Friends University, and finally his J.D.  degree from the Washburn University School of Law. Aaron has been in the financial services industry since 1998. Aaron's education relating to his brokerage qualifications include the Series 6, 63, and 65 licenses.

Career
Jack served as a Republican member of the Kansas House of Representatives, representing the 99th district from 2009 until 2010. In 2011, Jack was appointed Kansas Securities Commissioner serving until February 2013, when he resigned.  According to The Topeka Capital-Journal the resignation came with the choice of "resign or be fired" but Jack stated that he was "ready to get back to a private-sector career."

As Securities Commissioner Jack sought to be tough on crime by proposing a litigation fund which would provide more money for securities fraud prosecutions.

In May 2012, Jack was one of only six people to represent the United States at the G-20Y Financial Summit in Mexico CIty, Mexico. That same year he was selected and participated in Leadership Kansas' Class of 2012.

Jack is an investment adviser representative through AWM Asset Management, LLC and a registered representative through United Planners, LLC. Aaron has had no legal orders since becoming insurance licensed in 1999. Jack has also had no disclosure events related to his securities practice.

Aaron Jack served as campaign manager for U.S Representative Mike Pompeo's first congressional race.

Committee membership
 Federal and State Affairs
 Judiciary

Major donors
The top 5 donors to Jack's 2008 campaign:
 Jack, Daniel Aaron 	$20,000 	
 Jack, Aaron 	$2,000 	
 Koch Industries 	$1,000 	
 Kansas Medical Society 	$750 	
 Kansas Chamber of Commerce 	$500

References

External links
 
 Kansas Votes profile

Place of birth missing (living people)
Living people
Friends University alumni
Republican Party members of the Kansas House of Representatives
University of Kansas alumni
Washburn University alumni
1975 births